Châtillon, formerly known as Châtillon-d'Azergues, is a commune in the Rhône department, eastern France.

Sites and monuments

The Château de Châtillon-d'Azergues, a ruined 13th to 15th century castle, dominates the village. The 12th century Chapel of Saint-Barthélémy, known as Notre-Dame-de-Bon-Secours, is at the side of the castle.

The chapel was listed in 1862 as a monument historique by the French Ministry of Culture; the castle itself has been listed since 1937.

See also
Communes of the Rhône department
Azergues

References

Communes of Rhône (department)
Rhône communes articles needing translation from French Wikipedia